Stephen Báthory (1533–1586) was King of Poland and Grand Duke of Lithuania, Prince of Transylvania.

Stephen Báthory may also refer to:

 Stephen III Báthory (died 1444), Palatine of Hungary
 Stephen V Báthory (1430–1493), judge of the Royal Court and voivode of Transylvania 
 Stephen VII Báthory (died 1530), Palatine of Hungary
 Stephen VIII Báthory (1477–1534), voivode of Transylvania
 Stephen Báthory (1553–1601), father of Gabriel Báthory
 Stephen Báthory (1555–1605), judge royal

See also 
 Ocean liner TSS Stefan Batory
 Báthory